Zareh Nubar ( or Զարեհ Նուպար in Western Armenian) was son of Boghos Nubar, the founder of the Armenian General Benevolent Union (AGBU) and grandson of the Egyptian Prime Minister Nubar Pasha.

Zareh Nubar took over the presidency of AGBU following his father Boghos Nubar, who had been president 1906 to 1928 and Calouste Gulbenkian who became president briefly 1930–1932. Zareh Nubar remained president of AGBU for 12 years from 1932 to 1943.

Egyptian people of Armenian descent
Presidents of the Armenian General Benevolent Union